In United States law, a food of minimal nutritional value is one that USDA has determined contain little to no nutritional value; these foods may not be sold in competition with the school lunch and breakfast programs. For example, sugar candy, soda pop without fruit juices, and chewing gum are considered to be foods of minimal nutritional value. Candy containing nuts or chocolate is considered to have some nutritional value.

Examples 
The USDA defines these categories of food as having minimal nutritional value:
 Soda water, including diet soda
 Italian ice, unless made with fruit or fruit juices
 Chewing gum
 Some kinds of candy, including hard candy, jelly beans, gummy candies, marshmallows, fondant candies such as butter mints, licorice, cotton candy, and candy-coated popcorn.

See also
National School Lunch Act

References 

United States Department of Agriculture